Rose Valley Glacier is a glacier on Varna Peninsula, eastern Livingston Island in the South Shetland Islands, Antarctica situated northeast of Saedinenie Snowfield, northwest of Debelt Glacier and north of Panega Glacier.  It extends 5.2 km in southeast-northwest direction and 3.7 km in southwest-northeast direction, and drains the northeast slopes of Vidin Heights to flow into Lister Cove and McFarlane Strait between Pomorie Point and Inott Point.

The feature is named after the Valley of Roses in central Bulgaria.

Location

See also
 List of glaciers in the Antarctic
 Glaciology

Maps
 L.L. Ivanov et al. Antarctica: Livingston Island and Greenwich Island, South Shetland Islands. Scale 1:100000 topographic map. Sofia: Antarctic Place-names Commission of Bulgaria, 2005.
 L.L. Ivanov. Antarctica: Livingston Island and Greenwich, Robert, Snow and Smith Islands. Scale 1:120000 topographic map.  Troyan: Manfred Wörner Foundation, 2009.

References
 SCAR Composite Gazetteer of Antarctica
 Bulgarian Antarctic Gazetteer. Antarctic Place-names Commission. (details in Bulgarian, basic data in English)

External links
 Rose Valley Glacier. Copernix satellite image

Glaciers of Livingston Island